Jacqui (Jacob) Eli Safra (born c. 1940) is an investor from Geneva. He is a descendant of the Syrian Lebanese-Swiss Jewish Safra banking family.

Biography
Jacqui Eli Safra is the son of Elie Safra (1922–1993) and Yvette Dabbah (1927–2006) and the nephew of Edmond Safra. He is a graduate of the Wharton School of the University of Pennsylvania and worked in various positions at the Republic National Bank of New York.

Some of Safra's investments include Encyclopædia Britannica, Inc., Spring Mountain Vineyard (Saint Helena, California), Parknasilla Hotel and neighbouring Garinish Island (both near Sneem, County Kerry, Republic of Ireland).

Filmography
Under the name J.E. Beaucaire (the name of the character played by Bob Hope in the film Monsieur Beaucaire), Safra appeared in minor roles in three movies and financed eight Woody Allen films through a production company, Sweetland Films, run with his long-time girlfriend Jean Doumanian, a former close friend of Allen.

Actor

The Ox (1991) – Shop Owner
Radio Days (1987) – Diction Student
Stardust Memories (1980) – Sam

Executive producer

References

Additional references
Weinraub, Bernard. (June 11, 2001). "A Friendship Founders Over Suit by Woody Allen". The New York Times, p. 1.
Claffey, Mike & Goldiner, Dave. (June 6, 2002). "Judge Backhands Woody's Rival". Daily News (New York), p. 8.
Claffey, Mike & Goldiner, Dave. (June 7, 2002). "Woody's Backer Admits to Some Overcharging". Daily News (New York), p. 4.
Wapshott, Nicholas. (June 7, 2002). "To the jury, Woody Allen's former friend Jean Doumanian must appear scheming and grasping, while the diminutive comic seems a classic dupe" The Times (London).

External links

Spring Mountain Vineyard — company website

Living people
Swiss businesspeople
21st-century Syrian businesspeople
Swiss Sephardi Jews
Place of birth missing (living people)
Safra family
1940s births
Brazilian people of Syrian descent